Jim Eason is a conservative talk radio personality who hosted broadcasts from 1966 to 2000 in the San Francisco Bay Area.  He always ended his talk shows with the catchphrase "Do what you can, but behave yourself". His early 1970s theme was "Hold On, I'm Coming" by Sam & Dave. He later changed his opening theme to the Dave Brubeck/Paul Desmond jazz classic "Take Five".

Biography
James H. Eason, Jr. was born December 26, 1935, in Burlington, North Carolina, and attended schools in Graham, and Glade Valley, as well as one year at Edwards Military Academy.  He studied at Piedmont Bible College in Winston-Salem for a year before joining the United States Air Force in 1954.  In the USAF weather service, Eason was stationed in Illinois, then at Sidi Slimane and Nouasseur Air Base from 1955 to 1956. Following Morocco, he was based in San Antonio Texas, then Sondrestrom Fjord Greenland 1960-1961 and Merced CA from 1961 to 1963. After an honorable discharge from the USAF, Eason enrolled in the Radio Tv Broadcast Department at San Francisco State University from 1962 to 1964.

He has been married twice. He and his first wife Gay Sibley (1959-1963) have one son, Adam Lowe. Jim and his 2nd wife, Barbara (1964–present) have 2 children, their daughter Lauren and son James III.

Radio career
During his USAF assignment in Morocco, Eason broadcast a music call-in show over Armed Forces Radio in addition to his weather tower duties. (He left the USAF in 1963 from his last weather assignment in Merced.) 1964 was Eason's first Bay Area broadcast, when he guest hosted “Records at Random” on KSFO, opening his show with Ray Charles “What’d I Say”. Between 1966 and 1967 Eason both created and hosted "Testing 1-2-3", a call-in game show on KCBS.  In 1969, he joined KGO as a weekend talk show host after KCBS went to an all-news format.  In 1970, Eason became a KGO week night talk show host. He moved to weekday afternoons in 1973, frequently interviewing visiting entertainers, authors, and public figures.

In 1983, Eason portrayed poet Omar Khayam in the Capuchino Community Theatre production of Kismet, which was directed by close friend Jack Brooks (1935–1984), director, actor, singer, arts critic, and host of a Saturday morning KGO program.

A longtime resident of the San Francisco area, Eason moved to Asheville, North Carolina, in 1993, where he broadcast his KGO talk show via high speed connection from his home studio.  He was one of the first to do this type of remote broadcast on a regular basis.  In 1996, Eason moved his talk show to KGO's more conservative sister station KSFO, while continuing to broadcast from his home studio in Asheville.

Throughout his long talk show career, Eason's show always ranked #1 for the afternoon time slot of 1 p.m. to 4 p.m., then 2 p.m. to 4 p.m.

Eason quit KSFO radio due to a "philosophical" conflict with management in 2000, which marked his official retirement from broadcasting. KSFO had been his first San Francisco Bay Area radio broadcast gig, when he hosted one of their "Records at Random" shows in 1963.

Jim returned to Northern California in 2003. He was inducted into the Bay Area Radio Hall of Fame in 2007.

References

External links

 KGO 810 AM — offers live internet streaming feeds
 KSFO 560 AM — offers live internet streaming feeds
 KGO History — Some Events of the Past Decade (Unauthorized)

Year of birth missing (living people)
Living people
American talk radio hosts
Radio personalities from San Francisco